Křepice may refer to places in the Czech Republic:

Křepice (Břeclav District)
Křepice (Znojmo District)